Chryse, or Chrysa (Χρύσα), was a town of the ancient Troad, mentioned by Pliny as being on the coast north of Cape Lectum.

The site of Chryse  is located near modern Göztepe.

References

Populated places in ancient Troad
Former populated places in Turkey